The Dîner des trois empereurs or Three Emperors Dinner was a banquet held at Café Anglais in Paris, France on 7 June 1867. It consisted of 16 courses with eight wines served over eight hours.

Overview
The Three Emperors Dinner was prepared by chef Adolphe Dugléré at the request of King William I of Prussia who frequented the cafe during the Exposition Universelle. He requested a meal to be remembered and at which no expense was to be spared for himself and his guests, Tsar Alexander II of Russia, plus his son the tsarevitch (who later became Tsar Alexander III), and Prince Otto von Bismarck.

The name "Three Emperors Dinner" is something of a misnomer and apparently was applied retrospectively, as only Alexander II bore the title of Emperor at the time. Wilhelm I would not be proclaimed Kaiser (emperor) until 1871, whereas Alexander III would only ascend the Imperial Russian throne in 1881 after his father's assassination.

The cellar master, Claudius Burdel, was instructed to accompany the dishes with the greatest wines in the world, including a Roederer champagne in a special lead glass bottle, so Tsar Alexander could admire the bubbles and golden colour.

The banquet consisted of 16 courses with eight wines served over eight hours. The cost of the meal was 400 francs per person (over €9,000 in  prices). The high price of the wines served contributed to the high price of the meal.

At 1 o'clock in the morning, Tsar Alexander is reported to have complained that the meal had not contained foie gras. Burdel explained that it was not the custom in French cuisine to eat foie gras in June.  The tsar was satisfied with the answer. Each emperor was sent a terrine of foie gras as a gift the following October.

The table used for the banquet and a copy of the menu is on display at La Tour d'Argent restaurant in Paris.

Menu
The menu included the following, among the 16 courses:

Potage impératrice consists of a chicken stock thickened with tapioca and finished with egg yolks and cream, to which poached rounds of chicken forcemeat, cockscombs, cocks' kidneys and green peas are added.
Potage fontanges is a purée of fresh peas diluted with consommé with the addition of a chiffonade of sorrel and sprigs of chervil.
Soufflé à la reine is a chicken soufflé with truffles
Sauce vénitienne is a sauce of white wine, tarragon vinegar, shallots and chervil, mounted with butter and finished with chopped chervil and tarragon.
Selle de mouton purée Bretonne is saddle of mutton with a purée of broad beans bound with Breton sauce.
Poulet à la portugaise is whole chicken roasted with a covering of adobo paste consisting of tomato, red bell pepper, garlic, origanum, paprika, cayenne pepper, brown sugar, lemon juice, white wine, chicken stock and olive oil, stuffed with tomato flavoured rice.
Pâté chaud de cailles is warm pâté of quail.
Homard à la parisienne is lobster cooked in court bouillon, cut into slices and glazed with aspic, with a garnish of tomatoes stuffed with a macédoine of vegetables, dressed with a mixture of mayonnaise and aspic and garnished with sliced truffle.
Canetons à la rouennaise is a dish of roast duckling stuffed with forcemeat. The legs and breasts are removed, the legs are grilled and the breasts are thinly sliced and arranged around the stuffing. The remaining carcass is pressed in a poultry press to extract all the juices and is added to a Rouennaise sauce, which is poured over the sliced duck. (This dish is today the speciality of the house at La Tour d'Argent.)
Ortolans sur canapés, ortolans (now a protected species) on toast.
Aubergines à l'espagnole is a dish of aubergine shells filled with chopped aubergine, tomato and ham and a gruyère gratin.
Cassolette princesse, (a.k.a. Cassolette argenteuil), A cassolette with a border of duchesse potatoes and an asparagus filling in cream sauce.
Bombe glacée is an ice cream dessert.

– Source:

Re-creation
Australian chef Shannon Bennett attempted to recreate the banquet in 2002. It took six months to plan and required some changes due to key ingredients and wines no longer being available. Even using the nearest modern equivalent ingredients and wines, the cost of the meal was $7,500 per person. The Australian Broadcasting Corporation broadcast the documentary Three Emperors Dinner about the original banquet and the modern recreation in 2003.

See also
 Banquet of Chestnuts
 List of dining events
 Nobel Banquet

Gallery

References

Dining events
French cuisine
1867 in France
High society (social class)
June 1867 events
Dinner